Quararibea yunckeri is a species of flowering plant in the family Malvaceae. It is found only in Honduras.

References

yunckeri
Endemic flora of Honduras
Critically endangered flora of North America
Taxonomy articles created by Polbot